100 Cambridge Street, formerly the Leverett Saltonstall Building, is a high-rise building located in the Government Center district of Boston, Massachusetts. The building stands at 396 feet (121 m) with 22 floors. It was completed in 1965 and underwent major renovation and expansion in the early 2000s. The building is just a few feet shorter than the 400-foot (122 m) height required for inclusion on the  list of tallest buildings in Boston. The architectural firm that designed the building was Emery Roth & Sons. The building is notable for its distinctive International style architecture. The building was named in 1969 for former Massachusetts governor and United States Senator Leverett Saltonstall until its closure in 1999. When first opened it housed state offices; it now houses a mix of residential, commercial, and state tenants. Since October 2017, it has been the home of Sattler College.

Cleanup and expansion
The building was closed in 1999 for a two-year cleanup after asbestos was found in the building's air.  Prior to the renovation, it was occupied by state agencies. The $184 million project also included construction of a new, five-story structure wrapped around the base of the tower. The new structure included  of retail space, 56 market-rate condominiums, and 19 units of affordable housing. After the renovation, about half of the building's office space was rented to private tenants. The rest of the office space is used by Massachusetts state agencies. In 2015, the state sold the ground lease on the building for $280 million to the Intercontinental Real Estate Corporation. The building is now known as "100 Cambridge Street."

References

External links

Entry on Emporis
Entry on SkyscraperPage

Skyscraper office buildings in Boston
Office buildings completed in 1965
Government Center, Boston